Aleksandr Aleksandrovich Blinov (born August 20, 1981) is a Russian sport shooter, specializing in the 10 metre running target event. He won the silver medal at the 2004 Olympic Games in the 10 m Running Target event.

Records

References

External links
 Profile on issfnews.com

1981 births
Living people
Sportspeople from Vladivostok
Russian male sport shooters
Running target shooters
Olympic shooters of Russia
Shooters at the 2004 Summer Olympics
Olympic silver medalists for Russia
World record holders in shooting
Olympic medalists in shooting
Medalists at the 2004 Summer Olympics